Chicago XXVI: Live in Concert is a live album by the American band Chicago, their twenty-sixth album overall, released in 1999.   Their second live album to be released in the US, it was Chicago's first of the sort since 1971's Chicago at Carnegie Hall and 1972's Live in Japan, though the band had released commercial VHS tapes of two concerts in the early 1990s.

Background
Featuring the band's latter day line-up, Chicago XXVI: Live in Concert is composed mostly of their wealth of hits, with three brand new studio recordings ending the album, one of which, Jackie Wilson's "(Your Love Keeps Lifting Me) Higher and Higher", features non-band member Michael McDonald on lead vocals.

Released on their own Chicago Records imprint, Chicago XXVI: Live in Concert became the first new Chicago album to fail to chart upon its release (Take Me Back to Chicago, a compilation of hits and album tracks having failed to chart upon its release some 14 years earlier) and, consequently, went out of print a few years later. The imprint has since folded.

The reaction among fans who purchased the album was mixed. Many appreciated that the current line-up of the band finally had an official live release. Others also appreciated that the recording was done with modern recording equipment leading to a crisp, modern sound. The band was also applauded for clean, tight performances compared to sloppier performances in older recordings.

Criticism was often targeted at Michael McDonald's appearance as a lead vocalist when Chicago had several resident lead singers. In addition, the album's use of vocal and horn over-dubs to augment the actual live performance (a common practice with many live albums) received some criticism. Finally, the reaction to the song selection on the album was mixed. Some criticized its lack of representation of music from Chicago's post-1984 catalog while others noted that the live songs chosen for Chicago XXVI weren't substantially different from other live recordings the band had sold commercially in the 1990s.

Regardless of these criticisms, Chicago XXVI remains a popular collector's item, due to its relative obscurity compared to other albums in Chicago's catalog.

Track listing
"Ballet for a Girl in Buchannon" (James Pankow) – 13:29
"Make Me Smile"
"So Much to Say, So Much to Give"
"Anxiety's Moment
"West Virginia Fantasies"
"Colour My World"
"To Be Free"
"Now More Than Ever"
"(I've Been) Searchin' So Long" (Pankow) – 4:40
"Mongonucleosis" (Pankow) – 3:39
"Hard Habit To Break" (Steve Kipner, Jon Parker) – 5:16
"Call on Me" (Lee Loughnane) – 4:33
"Feelin' Stronger Every Day" (Peter Cetera, Pankow) – 4:24
"Just You 'n' Me" (Pankow) – 6:18
"Beginnings" (Robert Lamm) – 5:51
"Hard to Say I'm Sorry/Get Away" (Cetera, David Foster, Lamm) – 5:38
"25 or 6 to 4" (Lamm) – 5:51
"Back to You" (Lamm, Keith Howland) – 3:41
"If I Should Ever Lose You" (Burt Bacharach, Tonio K) – 4:30
"(Your Love Keeps Lifting Me) Higher and Higher" (Gary Jackson, Raynard Miner, Carl Smith) – 4:11
 Features Michael McDonald on lead vocal
 Tracks 11, 12, and 13 are new studio recordings

Chicago XXVI: Live in Concert (Chicago 26) did not chart in the US or UK.

Personnel 
Chicago
 Bill Champlin – keyboards, guitars, lead and backing vocals
 Keith Howland – acoustic guitar,  electric guitar, backing vocals
 Tris Imboden – drums, percussion
 Robert Lamm – keyboards, acoustic guitar, percussion, lead and backing vocals
 Lee Loughnane – trumpet, flugelhorn, percussion, backing vocals
 James Pankow – trombone, percussion, backing vocals
 Walter Parazaider – saxophones, flute, clarinet, backing vocals
 Jason Scheff – bass, lead and backing vocals

Production 
 Roy Bittan – producer (11)
 Mervyn Warren – producer (13)
 Roger Gibbons – engineer 
 Ted Perlman – engineer 
 Ed Thacker – engineer, mixing (1-10)
 Humberto Gatica – mixing (11, 12, 13)
 Carlos Garcia – additional engineer 
 Chris Blazier – production coordinator 
 John Kosh – art direction, design 

Crew
 Steve Brumbach – tour manager
 Tony Blanc – sound engineer 
 Ken Parkin – sound monitor
 Russ Achzet – keyboard technician 
 Hank Steiger – guitar technician
 Mike Bessinger – drum technician
 Tony Leo – horn technician
 Howard Kaufman – management 
 Peter Schivarelli – management

References

Albums produced by Roy Bittan
Chicago (band) live albums
1999 live albums